Vast Studios is a casual video game company founded in 2008 and headquartered in Toronto, Ontario, Canada.[1] They are the developer of 3Tones, a match 3 game nominated for RealNetworks' Great Game Awards[2], and the Nightfall Mysteries series. The studio also partnered with National Geographic to make a point-and-click style game based around the Salem Witch Trials called "Lost Chronicles: Salem," which was released on December 4th, 2010. [3] Vast's first publicly released game was "Hard Hittin' Hockey" in 2007. Vast Studios has since gone out of business, and in 2014, they were acquired by ISIS Lab Corporation,[4][5] now known as Tangelo Games Corp.[6]

Games
The company primarily produces puzzle and time management games; however, recent titles involved hidden object games. Their games are distributed via digital download portals such as Big Fish Games.[1] Also, they have been reviewed at Gamezebo.[2]

References

External links
Official Site
Vast Studios at MobyGames
Vast Studios at IGN

Video game companies of Canada
Companies based in Toronto
2008 establishments in Ontario
Video game companies established in 2008
Video game development companies